Longvale is an unincorporated community in Mendocino County, California.

A post office operated at Longvale from 1911 to 1958.

References

Unincorporated communities in California
Unincorporated communities in Mendocino County, California